The West Richwoods Church & School is a historic multifunction building on Arkansas Highway 9 in West Richwoods, Arkansas, a hamlet in rural central Stone County.  It is a vernacular rectangular frame structure, with a gable roof topped by a small open belfry.  The front facade is symmetrically arranged, with a recessed double-door entrance flanked by windows.  Built about 1921, it is one of the county's few surviving early schoolhouses.

The building was listed on the National Register of Historic Places in 1985.

See also
National Register of Historic Places listings in Stone County, Arkansas

References

Churches in Arkansas
Schools in Arkansas
Churches on the National Register of Historic Places in Arkansas
Churches completed in 1921
Churches in Stone County, Arkansas
National Register of Historic Places in Stone County, Arkansas
School buildings completed in 1921
1921 establishments in Arkansas